Massalengo is a comune (municipality) in the Province of Lodi in the Italian region Lombardy, located about  southeast of Milan and about  west of Lodi.

Massalengo borders the following municipalities: San Martino in Strada, Cornegliano Laudense, Pieve Fissiraga, Ossago Lodigiano, Villanova del Sillaro.

References

Cities and towns in Lombardy